Super Swap is an action puzzle game developed by Teyon for the Nintendo DSiWare. It is available in the Nintendo DSi Shop for 500 Nintendo DSi Points.

Gameplay

Super Swap is an arcade puzzle game with elements of a match-3 genre. Blocks fall from the top of the upper screen to the bottom of the touchscreen, one by one. A player has to use a stylus to click on blocks and to drag them in one of 4 directions. Dragging enables the player to swap blocks and as a result to remove pieces off the board by making 3-in-a row or more matches. Combos can be only achieved in a horizontal or vertical row. Objects can be swapped even while they're still falling. If blocks pile above the bottom of the upper screen, it is game over.

Modes
 Classic mode - after the first 30 blocks fall from the top, blocks will appear only when a player makes a swap or match.
 Speed mode - blocks are falling down from the top of the screen constantly and faster in each stage.
 Rows mode - the whole board is filled up with blocks and a player's task is to click on and drag rows or columns to make swaps.
 Death mode - blocks are falling down from the top of the upper screen all the time. The game ends and a player loses when blocks reach the top of the upper screen.

Reception
Super Swap received an overall score of 8/10 from Nintendo Life  and a 26/30 from Wiiloveit.com.

References

External links
 Super Swap's site at Teyon.com

2010 video games
DSiWare games
Nintendo DS-only games
Nintendo DS games
Video games developed in Poland
Logic puzzles

Single-player video games
Teyon games